Rajendra Prasad (born 17 January 1968 in Bhilai, Chhattisgarh, India) is a retired boxer from India. He competed in the Light flyweight (48 kg) division during the late 1980s and early 1990s, and was ranked as high as 7th. In 1992, the Indian government gave him Arjuna Award for his achievements in international boxing.

He represented India at the 1992 Summer Olympics in Barcelona, Spain, where he defeated Andrzej Rzany of Poland by 12-6 in first round. In the second round lost to bronze medalist Roel Velasco of the Philippines. He also participated at the 1993 World Amateur Boxing Championship.
He is currently President of the Chhattisgarh Pradesh Amateur Boxing Federation and Joint Secretary of the Chhattisgarh Olympics Association. He is married to Malini Prasad and they have two sons, Rahul Prasad and Rohit Prasad.

Awards and recognition 
 In 1992, Rajendra received the Arjuna Award, which is presented every year by the Government of India to recognize outstanding achievements in national sports in India. 
 Ranked 7th in International Boxing Association(AIBA) in 1992.
 Ranked 5th at Men's 1993 World Amateur Boxing Championships were held in Tampere, Finland

Olympic results 

Defeated Andrzej Rzany (Poland) 12-6
lost to Roel Velasco (Philippines) 6-15

References

External links
 http://amateur-boxing.strefa.pl/Championships/OlympicGames1992.html Results
 Arjuna Award
 Rajendra Prasad at Sports Reference
 http://www.the-sports.org/rajendra-prasad-amateur-boxing-spf219047.html
 http://www.the-sports.org/amateur-boxing-world-men-s-boxing-championships-results-1993-men-epm36661.html#162419
 http://amateur-boxing.strefa.pl/Championships/AsianChampionships1992.html
 http://www.the-sports.org/rajendra-prasad-amateur-boxing-spf219047.html

1968 births
Living people
Indian male boxers
Boxers from Chhattisgarh
Olympic boxers of India
Recipients of the Arjuna Award
Boxers at the 1992 Summer Olympics
South Asian Games silver medalists for India
South Asian Games medalists in boxing
Light-flyweight boxers